David Hillman may refer to:
 David Hillman (tenor)
 David Hillman (politician)

See also
 Dave Hillman, American baseball player